Exo-CBX is the first sub-unit of South Korean–Chinese boy band Exo, consisting of Chen, Baekhyun, and Xiumin. Formed by SM Entertainment, the group debuted with their first EP Hey Mama! on October 31, 2016.

History

2016: Formation, debut and Hey Mama!

On July 29, 2016, Chen, Baekhyun and Xiumin appeared in a video titled "Reservoir Idols" during Exo's concert tour Exo Planet 3 – The Exo'rdium. They then released an original soundtrack titled "For You" for the SBS television drama series Moon Lovers: Scarlet Heart Ryeo on August 23, 2016. As a result, it was speculated that they would form Exo's first sub-unit. This was confirmed by SM Entertainment on October 5. On October 23, they performed "For You" for the first time as a unit at the 2016 Busan One Asia Festival. On October 24, the unit's name was announced to be Exo-CBX (shortened from ChenBaekXi), after the first letter of the members' stage names.

On October 31, Exo-CBX released their debut extended play Hey Mama!, which contains five tracks with a variety of genres including electronic dance, R&B ballad and retro pop, along with the music video for the title track. The group made their debut performance on M Countdown on November 3. On November 6, the "Reservoir Idols" video was officially released as a music video for "The One", one of the tracks from the album. Hey Mama! topped the Billboard World Albums chart and South Korean's Gaon album chart. Later in November, Exo-CBX recorded a remake of the original soundtrack "Crush U" for the game Blade & Soul. They performed the song on November 18 at the N-Pop Showcase concert, part of the 2016 Blade & Soul world championship tournament. On December 25, "Crush U" music video was released.

2017: Debut in Japan
On May 10, through EXO's official Japanese Twitter account, SM announced that the sub-unit was going to have a Japanese debut during late May. They released their debut Japanese mini album, Girls, on May 24.

2018–present: First Japan arena tour, Blooming Days and Magic
In January 2018, via an online program on LINE, they announced that they have prepared for their first Japan arena tour called "Magical Circus" in May and June. The tour had eight shows with four cities in Japan, including: Yokohama, Fukuoka, Nagoya and Osaka. On April 10, the group released their second Korean mini album Blooming Days. CBX's first Japanese studio album, Magic, was released on May 9.

In February 2019, it was announced that the group would have Special Edition concerts of their Japanese tour "Magical Circus" in April.

Discography

Studio albums

Extended plays

Singles

Promotional singles

Other charted songs

Soundtrack appearances

Filmography

Music videos

DVDs

Tours
 Magical Circus (2018)
 Magical Circus - Special Edition (2019)

Awards and nominations

Notes

References

External links

  

Exo
K-pop music groups
Musical groups established in 2016
Musical groups from Seoul
Japanese-language singers
SM Entertainment artists
SM Town
South Korean boy bands
Funk musicians
South Korean musical trios
Avex Group artists